

Champions
World Series: Pittsburgh Pirates over Washington Senators (4-3)
Negro World Series: Hilldale Daisies over Kansas City Monarchs (5-1)

Awards and honors
League Award
 Roger Peckinpaugh, Washington Senators, SS
 Rogers Hornsby, St. Louis Cardinals, 2B

MLB statistical leaders

Major league baseball final standings

American League final standings

National League final standings

Negro leagues final standings

Negro National League final standings
This was the sixth season of the first Negro National League. This was the first season in which a playoff was held to determine the pennant, for which the first half leader would be matched against the second half winner. Kansas City won the first half while St. Louis won the second half. As such, they met for a best-of-seven Championship Series. Kansas City would win the series in seven games to win their first pennant.

Eastern Colored League final standings
This was the third of six seasons for the Eastern Colored League. According to the Center for Negro League Baseball Research, it was common practice for the teams in the league to all play a different number of games during the season. The Wilmington Potomacs dropped out of the league in July 1925. Hilldale Club faced the Kansas City Monarchs in the second overall Colored World Series.

Events
April 14
On opening day, there is a slugfest in St. Louis as the Browns and visiting Cleveland Indians put up a combined 35 runs. Cleveland puts up twelve in the eighth, and wins 21-14.
Hall of Famer Lefty Grove is the opening day starter for the Philadelphia Athletics. He lasts 3.2 innings, and gives up five runs (four earned) in his major league debut. Fellow Hall of Famer Mickey Cochrane also makes his major league debut, and is one-for-two as the A's defeat the Boston Red Sox, 9-8 in ten innings.
April 21 - The National League cancels the entire slate of games due to the death of Brooklyn Dodgers owner Charles Ebbets three days prior from a heart attack. Edward McKeever assumes the title of president of the club. However, McKeever's tenure is short lived, as he dies eight days later from influenza. 
May 1 – Jimmie Foxx hits a double in his first major league at-bat. His Athletics lose 9-4 to the Washington Senators.
May 5
Detroit Tigers player/manager Ty Cobb hits three home runs, a double and two singles, to lead his team to a 14–8 victory against the St. Louis Browns at Sportsman's Park.
Everett Scott's record streak of 1‚307 consecutive games played comes to an end as he is replaced by rookie Pee-Wee Wanninger at shortstop in the 6–2 loss to the Philadelphia Athletics. His mark will be broken by Lou Gehrig on August 17, .
May 7 – Pittsburgh Pirates shortstop Glenn Wright turns the fifth unassisted triple play in Major League history in the ninth inning of a 10-9 loss to the St. Louis Cardinals.
May 17 – The Cleveland Indians' Tris Speaker gets his 3,000th hit, off Tom Zachary, in a 2-1 loss to the Washington Senators.
June 1 – Lou Gehrig pinch hits for Pee-Wee Wanninger, beginning a 2,130 consecutive game streak.
June 2 – After losing five in a row, New York Yankees manager Miller Huggins "shakes up" the slumping lineup by replacing first baseman Wally Pipp in the starting lineup with Lou Gehrig, and second baseman Aaron Ward with utility infielder Howie Shanks. The strategy works as Gehrig goes three-for-five with a run scored, and Shanks goes one-for-four with a run scored in the Yankees' 8-5 victory over the Washington Senators. Pipp only logs seventeen more plate appearances for the rest of the season, and is sold to the Cincinnati Reds for $7,500 following the season.
June 6 – Eddie Collins of the Chicago White Sox records his 3000th career hit.
July 23 – Yankees first baseman Lou Gehrig hits the first of his major league record 23 grand slams to beat Firpo Marberry and the Senators, 11–7.
August 6 – Three American League teams put up ten runs, as the Chicago White Sox defeat the Boston Red Sox 10-0, the New York Yankees defeat the Detroit Tigers 10-4 and the Washington Senators defeat the St. Louis Browns 10-3.
August 25 – Boston Red Sox catcher Al Stokes finishes an unusual double play, tagging Detroit Tigers base runners Johnny Bassler and Fred Haney as they both simultaneously slide into home plate.
August 27 – The St. Louis Browns' Bullet Joe Bush one hits the Washington Senators to complete a three-game sweep of the first place team.
August 30 – After being swept by the St. Louis Browns at Sportsman's Park, the Washington Senators come back and sweep the Chicago White Sox at Comiskey Park. They sweep the second place Philadelphia Athletics on September 1 & 2 to build a 5.5 game lead, and coast the remainder of the way to their second consecutive American League championship.
September 13 – Dazzy Vance pitches a no-hitter for the Brooklyn Robins in a 10-1 win over the Philadelphia Phillies.
September 27 – 1925 National League Most Valuable Player Rogers Hornsby goes three-for-three to raise his batting average to .403. The Cardinals, however, lose 7-6 to the Boston Braves. With the Cards 19 games back of first place, Hornsby sits out the remaining four games on his team's schedule to secure a .400 average for the third time in his career.
September 28 – The Washington Senators are guests of President Calvin Coolidge at the White House, becoming the first reigning World Series champions to visit the White House.
October 2
Leo Durocher makes his major league debut in the Yankees' 10-0 loss to the Philadelphia Athletics.
Replacing Rogers Hornsby at second base in the St. Louis Cardinals' line-up, Specs Toporcer is the hitting star of the Cardinals' 4-3 victory over the Chicago Cubs with a home run, double and two runs scored. Toporcer goes eight-for-eighteen filling in for Hornsby in the final four games on the Cardinals' schedule.
October 4 – Ty Cobb pitches a 1-2-3 ninth inning in the Detroit Tigers' 11-6 victory over the St. Louis Browns.
October 7 – Walter Johnson's pitching leads the Washington Senators to a 4-1 victory over the Pittsburgh Pirates in game one of the 1925 World Series. Senators shortstop Roger Peckinpaugh commits the first of a record eight errors in the series.
October 8 – Kiki Cuyler's two-run home run in the eighth inning carriers the Pittsburgh Pirates to a 3-2 victory in the second game of the World Series.
October 10 – The Washington Senators come from behind to take game three of the World Series.
October 11 – Walter Johnson wins his second game of the 1925 World Series, holding the Pirates to six hits, and no runs.
October 12 – The Pirates take game five of the World Series, 6-3. Clyde Barnhart is the hitting star of the game, going two-for-four with two RBIs and a run scored.
October 13 – Eddie Moore leads the fifth inning off with a home run to break a 2-2 tie as the Pirates even the World Series at three games apiece.
October 15 – Walter Johnson again took the mound for Game seven, and carried a 6–4 lead into the bottom of the seventh inning, but errors by 1925 American League Most Valuable Player Roger Peckinpaugh in the seventh and eighth innings lead to four unearned runs, and the Pittsburgh Pirates defeat the Washington Senators, 9-7. The Pirates become the first team in a best-of-seven Series to overcome a 3–1 Series deficit to win the World Championship.
October 21 – Marv Goodwin, a former pitcher for the Washington Senators and St. Louis Cardinals who joined the Cincinnati Reds at the end of the season, is killed in a plane he was piloting. Goodwin was one of the original spitballers whose method for getting batters out was grandfathered when that pitch was deemed illegal. At age 34, Goodwin becomes the first active Major League player to die from injuries sustained in an airplane crash.

Births

January
January 4 – Tom Gorman
January 7 – Gene Collins
January 12 – Ed Stevens
January 17 – Hank Schmulbach
January 19 – Alice Hohlmayer
January 19 – Marilyn Jones
January 22 – Johnny Bucha
January 22 – Bobby Young
January 24 – Meryle Fitzgerald
January 30 – Brooks Lawrence

February
February 2 – Joe Szekely
February 3 – Harry Byrd
February 5 – Jack Maguire
February 8 – Milt Nielsen
February 9 – Vic Wertz
February 11 – Sara Reeser
February 13 – Mike Palm
February 14 – Buddy Lively
February 18 – Joe Lutz
February 19 – Takumi Otomo
February 22 – Bob Wilson

March
March 1 – Bob Usher
March 3 – George Eyrich
March 5 –  Mary Rini
March 10 – Lou Limmer
March 10 – Amy Shuman
March 13 – Ray Martin
March 18 – Fred Hatfield
March 20 – Al Widmar
March 21 – Phil Pepe
March 24 – Dick Kryhoski

April
April 6 – Hal Schacker
April 10 – Pete Milne
April 11 – Bob Spicer
April 16 – Alton Brown
April 23 – Buddy Peterson
April 24 – Theda Marshall
April 28 – Clarence Marshall
April 30 – Marie Wegman

May
May 1 – Anna Mae Hutchison
May 2 – Ralph Brickner
May 5 – Bob Cerv
May 5 – Johnny Rutherford
May 12 – Yogi Berra
May 14 – Sophie Kurys
May 14 – Les Moss
May 20 – Lee Griffeth
May 21 – Margaret Wenzell
May 25 – Don Liddle
May 31 – Colleen Smith

June
June 2 – Hazel Measner
June 4 – Dick Aylward
June 8 – Del Ennis
June 8 – Eddie Gaedel
June 9 – Jim Pearce
June 11 – Al Smith
June 14 – Fenton Mole
June 15 – Gene Baker
June 20 – Clem Koshorek
June 24 – Jack Banta
June 24 – Wally Yonamine
June 27 – Wayne Terwilliger
June 29 – Bill Connelly
June 29 – Nippy Jones

July
July 2 – Isaiah Harris
July 15 – Bob Wellman
July 18 – Windy McCall
July 21 – Earl Mossor
July 22 – Elise Harney
July 26 – Jackie Mayo
July 26 – Emily Stevenson
July 30 – Bill Glynn
July 30 – Bill Moisan
July 31 – Harry Malmberg

August
August 1 – Bobby Balcena
August 3 – Dave Hoskins
August 5 – Tony Jacobs
August 5 – Ruth Born
August 15 – Ruth Lessing
August 16 – Willie Jones
August 20 – Larry Miggins
August 25 – Earle Brucker
August 26 – Billy DeMars
August 28 – Johnny Pramesa
August 30 – George Wilson
August 31 – Paul Hinrichs
August 31 – Pete Vonachen

September
September 8 – Mary Carey
September 9 – Dorothy Christ
September 12 – Stan Lopata
September 13 – Frank Cashen
September 17 – Shigeru Sugishita
September 18 – Harvey Haddix
September 24 – Wally Hood
September 26 – Bobby Shantz
September 28 – Fredda Acker
September 28 – Vince Gonzales
September 28 – Bill Jennings
September 28 – Carolyn Morris
September 29 – Tom Hamilton

October
October 3 – Chris Haughey
October 5 – Bobby Hofman
October 7 – Mildred Earp
October 9 – Tommy Giordano
October 18 – Joyce Barnes
October 20 – Chuck Brayton
October 21 – Valmy Thomas
October 25 – Roy Hartsfield
October 26 – Lee Surkowski
October 28 – Luis Márquez

November
November 3 – Irene Kerwin
November 4 – Spook Jacobs
November 6 – Bob Addis
November 9 – Bill Bruton
November 10 – Hank Ruszkowski
November 13 – Jim Delsing
November 13 – Betty Whiting
November 17 – Jean Faut
November 18 – Gene Mauch
November 19 – Chuck Comiskey
November 21 – Lillian DeCambra
November 29 – Minnie Miñoso

December
December 1 – Niles Jordan
December 1 – Cal McLish
December 3 – Harry Simpson
December 4 – Ted Toles Jr.
December 6 – Rance Pless
December 8 – Hank Thompson
December 11 – Dick Hoover
December 14 – Toothpick Sam Jones
December 19 – Loretta Dwojak
December 21 – Dorothy Kamenshek
December 21 – Kent Peterson
December 21 – Bob Rush
December 23 – Ed Blake
December 25 – Ned Garver
December 25 – Dorothy Mueller
December 26 – Lucille Stone
December 29 – Joyce Hill
December 31 – Dorothy Kovalchick

Deaths

January–February
January 1 – Hank Simon, 62, outfielder for the Cleveland Blues, Brooklyn Gladiators and Syracuse Stars of the American Association between the 1887 and 1890 seasons.
January 16 – George Bignell, 66, backup catcher for the 1884 Milwaukee Brewers of the Union Association.
January 25 – Cy Bowen, 63, pitcher for the 1896 New York Giants of the National League.
January 25 – John B. Day, 77, first owner, and manager in 1899, of the New York Giants.
February 15 – Duke Farrell, 58, durable catcher who caught 1565 games from 1888 to 1905 while playing with seven different teams, particularly for the 1903 Boston Americans, the champion team in the first World Series ever played, and also a four-time .300 hitter who led the American Association in home runs and runs batted in 1891.
February 18 – Charlie Dougherty, 63, infielder/outfielder for the 1884 Altoona Mountain City of the Union Association.
February 20 – John Mansell, 66,  outfielder for the 1882 Philadelphia Athletics of the American Association.

March–April
March 4 – John Montgomery Ward, 65, Hall of Fame pitcher who posted 164-102 record and a 2.10 earned run average in 293 games, including 47 wins for 1879 champion Providence Grays and a perfect game in 1880. He then became a shortstop, batting over .325 three times, to become the  fifth player to reach the 2000 hit club. In addition, he organized the first players' union in 1888, and formed the Players' League in 1890.
March 21 – Harry Raymond, 63, infielder who played with the Louisville Colonels of the American Association (1888–1891) and for the Pittsburgh Pirates and Washington Senators of the National League (1892).
March 23 – Tom Evers, 72,  second baseman for the 1882 Baltimore Orioles of the American Association and the 1884 Washington Nationals of the Union Association.
April 18 – Charles Ebbets, 65, owner of Brooklyn's National League franchise since 1897 and the builder and namesake of Ebbets Field.
April 19 – Suter Sullivan, 52, infielder/outfielder who played from 1898 to 1899 for the Cleveland Spiders and Baltimore Orioles of the National League.
April 23 – Ad Gumbert, 56, pitcher who collected a 123-102 record for the Chicago Cubs, Boston Reds, Pittsburgh Pirates and Philadelphia Phillies from 1888 through 1896.
April 27 – Fred Crane, 84, first baseman for the Elizabeth Resolutes (1873) and the Brooklyn Atlantics (1875) of the  National Association of Professional Base Ball Players.
April 29 – Ed McKeever, 66, co-owner of Brooklyn Robins since 1912 who succeeded Charles Ebbets as team president, but died from influenza only 11 days after Ebbets.

May–June
May 9 – Ed Beatin, 58, National League pitcher for the Detroit Wolverines and Cleveland Spiders from 1887 to 1891, and a member of the 1887 champion Wolverines.
May 10 – Tod Brynan, 61, National League pitcher/left fielder for the Chicago White Stockings (1888) and the Boston Beaneaters (1891).
May 31 – Harry Deane, 79, National Association outfielder for the Fort Wayne Kekiongas (1871) and the Baltimore Canaries (1874), who also managed briefly the Fort Wayne team.
June 5 – Sam Trott, 66, National League catcher for the Boston Red Caps, Detroit Wolverines and Baltimore Orioles, who later managed the Washington Statesmen in 1891.
June 26 – Sam Crane, 71, 19th century second baseman in seven seasons for the New York Metropolitans, Cincinnati Outlaw Reds, Detroit Wolverines, St. Louis Maroons, New York Giants and Pittsburgh Alleghenys, who also managed and later went on to a long career as a sportswriter.

July–August
July 4 – George Derby, 87, pitcher for the Detroit Wolverines (1881–1882) and Buffalo Bisons (1885) of the National League, who led the circuit for the most strikeouts in 1881.
August 2 – Patrick T. Powers, 63, founder of the minor leagues' governing body and its first president from 1901 to 1909.
August 13 – Arthur Soden, 82, American Civil War veteran and owner or co-owner of the National League's Boston Red Stockings/Red Caps/Beaneaters franchise from 1876 to 1906, who also served as NL president in 1882; under his ownership, Boston won seven NL pennants between 1876 and 1898.
August 14 – Asa Stratton, 72, shortstop who played for the 1881 Worcester Ruby Legs.

September–October
September 5 – Emil Huhn, 33, first baseman and catcher for the Federal League's Newark Pepper (1915) and the National League's Cincinnati Reds (1916–1917).
September 11 – Pat Duff, 50, pinch-hitter for the 1906 Washington Senators of the American League.
September 21 – Charlie Irwin, 56, third baseman who played from 1893 through 1902 for the Chicago Colts, Cincinnati Reds and Brooklyn Superbas of the National League.
September 22 – Dave Beadle, 61, catcher/outfielder for the 1884 Detroit Wolverines of the National League.
October 7 – Christy Mathewson, 45, Hall of Fame pitcher for the New York Giants, whose 373 victories and a 2.13 earned run average included two no-hitters and thirteen 20-win seasons. Notably, Mathewson reached 30 wins four times and posted an ERA under 2.00 five times, including a National League record of 37 wins in 1908, while leading the circuit in ERA and strikeouts five times each; in wins and shutouts four times, setting league's career records for wins, strikeouts, games and shutout. Other of his highlights includes having pitched three shutouts in a six-day span to lead the Giants to the 1905 World Series title.
October 19 – Jack Carney, 58, National League first baseman for the Washington Nationals, Buffalo Bisons and Cleveland Infants from 1889 to 1890.
October 21 – Marv Goodwin, 34, former pitcher for the Washington Senators, St. Louis Cardinals and Cincinnati Reds between 1916 and 1925, and one of the original spitballers who was grandfathered when that pitch was deemed illegal.
October 28 – Willy Wilson, 41, pitcher for the 1906 Washington Senators of the American League.

November–December
November 1 – Roy Clark, 51, backup outfielder for the 1902 New York Giants of the National League.
November 1 – Billy Serad, 62, National League pitcher who played between 1884 and 1888 with the Buffalo Bisons and Cincinnati Red Stockings.
November 3 – Sam Frock, 42, National League pitcher for the Boston Doves/Rustlers and Pittsburgh Pirates between 1907 and 1911.
November 6 – Harvey McClellan, 30, backup infielder for the Chicago White Sox from 1919 to 1924.
November 7 – Sam Kimber, 73, pitcher for the 1884 Brooklyn Atlantics and the 1885 Providence Grays of the National League, who hurled a no-hitter in his first season.
November 9 – Ralph Frary, 49, saloon-keeper and ex-minor league player who umpired 17 National League games during the 1911 season.
November 20 – Walter Coleman, 52, pitcher for the 1895 St. Louis Cardinals.
November 23 – Henry Lynch, 59, outfielder for the 1893 Chicago Colts of the National League.
November 23 – Guerdon Whiteley, 66, backup outfielder for the Cleveland Blues (1884) and the Boston Beaneaters (1885) of the National League.
December 19 – Corty Maxwell, 74, National Association umpire during the 1875 season.
December 31 – Denny Sullivan, 67, third baseman for the Providence Grays 1879 National League champions and the 1880 Boston Red Caps.

References